Abdihamid Sheikh Abdisalam Isse ( is a Somalian politician. He is the  Deputy Speaker of Puntland Parliament.

Biography

Isse was born in Garowe, the capital city of Puntland State of Somalia. he hails from the Majeerteen Harti Darod clan. He is the eldest among his nine siblings. His mother's name is Halima Osman and his father's name is Abdisalam Isse.
He Is The former Deputy Speaker Of  Puntland Parliament.

References

Living people
Somalian politicians
Somalian Muslims
Year of birth missing (living people)